Snap (1750 – July 1777) was a Thoroughbred racehorse who won all four of his races. After retiring from racing he became a successful stallion. He was Champion sire four times and his progeny included the undefeated Goldfinder.

Background
Snap was a brown colt foaled in 1750. Bred by Cuthbert Routh and Lord Portmore, as a yearling he was valued at £70. Snap's sire was Snip, a son of the undefeated Flying Childers. His dam was a sister to Slipby and a daughter to Fox. He was sold to Jenison Shafto when Cuthbert Routh died in 1752.

Racing career
Snap's first race came in the spring of 1756 at Newmarket, where he beat Marske to win 1000 guineas. Both horses were carrying ten stone in weight. In the following meeting at Newmarket he again beat Marske for 1000 guineas off level weights, after starting as the 1/10 favourite he won easily. Snap beat Farmer and Music to win the £100 Free Plate, which was run in four mile heats. The Free Plate was run at York, his only race away from Newmarket. His fourth and final race came at Newmarket in April 1757, where he beat Sweepstakes to win 1000 guineas.

Stud career
After his final race Snap was sent to Kenton, Northumberland to replace his sire Snip at stud. He became a leading sire and was Champion sire in 1767, 1768, 1769 and 1771. His progeny included Latham's Snap and the undefeated Goldfinder. His was also the broodmare sire of Epsom Derby winners Assassin and Sir Peter Teazle. Sir Peter Teazle also went on to become a 10-time Champion sire. Snap died in July 1777 at West Wratting in Cambridgeshire, where he had been standing at stud since 1767. In total he sired winners of over 260 races worth over £90,000.

See also
List of leading Thoroughbred racehorses

Pedigree

Note: b. = Bay, blk. = Black, br. = Brown, gr. = Grey

* Snap was inbred 3x4 to Bay Peg. This means that the mare appears once in the third generation and once in the fourth generation of his pedigree.

References

1750 racehorse births
1777 racehorse deaths
British Champion Thoroughbred Sires
Racehorses bred in the Kingdom of Great Britain
Racehorses trained in the Kingdom of Great Britain
Thoroughbred family 1
Undefeated racehorses
Individual male horses